The 2000 Great American Bash was the 10th Great American Bash professional wrestling pay-per-view (PPV) event produced by World Championship Wrestling (WCW), and 14th Great American Bash event overall. It took place on June 11, 2000, at the Baltimore Arena in Baltimore, Maryland. This was the eighth and final Great American Bash held at this venue after the 1988, 1989, 1990, 1991, 1996, 1998, and 1999 events.

This was the final Great American Bash event produced by WCW as in March 2001, WCW was acquired by the World Wrestling Federation (WWF); the WWF was renamed to World Wrestling Entertainment (WWE) in 2002. In 2004, WWE revived The Great American Bash as their own annual PPV event.

Production

Background
The Great American Bash is a professional wrestling event established in 1985. It was first produced by the National Wrestling Alliance's (NWA) Jim Crockett Promotions (JCP) and aired on closed-circuit television before becoming a pay-per-view event in 1988; JCP was rebranded as World Championship Wrestling (WCW) later that same year. WCW then seceded from the NWA in 1991. The 2000 event was the 10th Great American Bash event promoted by WCW and 14th overall. It took place on June 11, 2000 at the Baltimore Arena in Baltimore, Maryland. This was the eighth Great American Bash held at this venue after the 1988, 1989, 1990, 1991, 1996, 1998, and 1999 events.

Storylines
The event featured professional wrestling matches that involve different wrestlers from pre-existing scripted feuds and storylines. Professional wrestlers portray villains, heroes, or less distinguishable characters in the scripted events that build tension and culminate in a wrestling match or series of matches.

Event

Shane Douglas put the Wall through three tables at the same time to win. The first wrestler to put their opponent through three tables would win the match. Hollywood Hogan pinned Billy Kidman after hitting him with brass knuckles to become number one contender to the WCW World Heavyweight Championship. If Hogan had lost, he would have had to retire. If Ric Flair had lost his match, he would have had to retire. Vampiro set Sting on fire to win the match. Jeff Jarrett pinned Kevin Nash after a Spear from Goldberg. Konnan was guest bellringer, Rey Misterio Jr. was guest timekeeper, Disqo was guest beltkeeper, Juventud Guerrera was guest ring announcer. After the match, Goldberg joined the New Blood.

Reception
In 2017, Kevin Pantoja of 411Mania gave the event a rating of 1.0 [Extremely Horrendous], stating, "I’ve now reviewed half the WCW PPVs in 2000 and the highest score one has gotten was 3.5/10. This was rough. When the best match involves David Flair, you know your show is in trouble. Two DUDs and two matches went into negative stars. That’s never a good thing. Not only was the wrestling bad, but nothing made sense. There were random turns for [no] reason (Goldberg and Kanyon), stupid stunts (Sting and Booker), overbooking, a lame circle cage match and stipulations that were wrongly done (Tables match). A giant mess."

Aftermath
The 2000 Great American Bash was the final Great American Bash held by WCW, as in March 2001, the World Wrestling Federation (WWF) purchased WCW. In 2002, the WWF was renamed to World Wrestling Entertainment (WWE), and in 2004, WWE revived The Great American Bash as their own annual PPV.

Results

References

Professional wrestling in Baltimore
2000 in Maryland
Events in Maryland
2000
June 2000 events in the United States
2000 World Championship Wrestling pay-per-view events